Paris Parisians could refer to

Paris Parisians (Eastern Illinois League), a minor league baseball team from Paris, Illinois, that played in 1907 as the Paris Colts and in 1908 as the Paris Parisians
Paris Parisians (KITTY League), a minor league baseball team from Paris, Tennessee, that played from 1923 to 1924
Citizens of Paris, France